Brian Priske Pedersen (born 14 May 1977) is a Danish professional football manager and former player, who is the current head coach of Czech First League club Sparta Prague. Priske played as a defender during his playing career.

He played 24 matches for the Denmark national football team from 2003 to 2007, and represented Denmark at the 2004 European Championship (Euro 2004) tournament.

Club career
Born in Horsens, Priske started his career for Danish club Stensballe IK, a Horsens suburb club. Still a youth, he moved to Horsens Forenede Sportsklubber (HFS), now called AC Horsens. He moved on to Aarhus Fremad in 1997 before settling at AaB in 1999. There he won the Danish Superliga championship in 1999, and captained the club at the end of his tenure. He moved to Belgian club Genk in the summer of 2003.

When he played the full match in Denmark's 4–1 win over England on 17 August 17, Priske aroused the interest of several Premiership club and he joined Portsmouth five days later for an undisclosed fee, signing a three-year deal. Priske was given a good run in the Portsmouth side by Alain Perrin, but after Perrin was sacked that November Priske was dropped by returning manager Harry Redknapp. Many Portsmouth supporters assumed that this was because of Redknapp's disdain of using players he himself had not purchased, and speculation was rife in the January transfer window that Priske would be leaving the club.

A move away from Fratton Park never materialized, however, and following Portsmouth's poor run of form and injuries to several defenders, Priske was returned to the side for match against Manchester City on 11 March. Priske was from then an ever-present as Portsmouth then went on an excellent run of form for their final 10 matches of the season, earning the club Premiership survival for another year. Since arriving from K.R.C. Genk, Priske has been a popular player amongst Portsmouth supporters. Many were originally unhappy that Priske had been frozen-out of the team with Redknapp's return, and felt justified in their valuation of the player after the impressive role he played in earning the club survival from relegation.

Priske had become a fan favourite since his arrival at Fratton Park as a result of his impressive form, but in spite of this, rumours of his departure from the south coast resurfaced during the 2006–07 pre-season. Priske revealed to the Danish media that he had been told to find a new club before the start of the next season before returning to Belgium, joining Club Brugge in August 2006. The news was met with confusion and anger among Portsmouth fans. In Bruges, Priske competed with fan favourites Olivier De Cock and Birger Maertens for a place in the starting line-up. Priske became a first team regular, and helped the team win the 2007 Belgian Cup.

In the summer of 2008, Priske returned to the Danish Superliga to play for Vejle Boldklub. He could not save the club from relegation to the Danish 1st Division in 2009, but stayed with the team. In the summer of 2010, he was loaned out to Superliga club FC Midtjylland. On 21 January 2011, he signed for Start.

International career
While at AaB, Priske made his debut for the Danish national team in February 2003. He was a part of the Danish squad at the Euro 2004, and played 14 minutes in the 0–0 group game with Italy, coming on as a substitute to replace Christian Poulsen. Following retirement and injuries in the Danish defense, Priske became a more consistent member of the national team. In the 2006 World Cup qualification stage he played 10 out of 12 matches, though Denmark did not qualify for the finals. He played one game in the UEFA Euro 2008 qualification, a 1–2 loss to Northern Ireland in November 2007, after which he was dropped from the national team.

Managerial career
Priske served as assistant of FC Midtjylland and FC København from 2011 to 2019. When Kenneth Andersen resigned as manager of FC Midtjylland on 19 August 2019, Priske succeeded him. On 29 may 2021 Priske signed a new contract for two seasons with Royal Antwerp Football Club.

Personal life
His son August Priske is also a professional footballer.

Managerial statistics

Honours

Player
AaB
 Danish Superliga: 1998–99

Club Brugge
 Belgian Cup: 2007

Manager
Midtjylland
 Danish Superliga: 2019–20

References

External links
 FC Midtjylland profile
Danish national team profile
NationalFootballTeams statistics

1977 births
Living people
People from Horsens
Association football defenders
Danish men's footballers
Vejle Boldklub players
AC Horsens players
Aarhus Fremad players
AaB Fodbold players
K.R.C. Genk players
Portsmouth F.C. players
Club Brugge KV players
FC Midtjylland players
IK Start players
Danish Superliga players
Belgian Pro League players
Premier League players
Eliteserien players
Expatriate footballers in England
Expatriate footballers in Belgium
UEFA Euro 2004 players
Denmark international footballers
Denmark under-21 international footballers
Danish expatriate men's footballers
FC Midtjylland managers
Royal Antwerp F.C. managers
Danish football managers
Danish expatriate sportspeople in England
Danish expatriate sportspeople in Belgium
Danish Superliga managers
Sportspeople from the Central Denmark Region
AC Sparta Prague managers
Czech First League managers
Danish expatriate sportspeople in the Czech Republic
Expatriate football managers in the Czech Republic